Shawn Ethelbert King (born June 6, 1982) is a Vincentian professional basketball player, who lastly played for Stal Ostrów Wielkopolski of the Polish Basketball League (PLK). King is one of Saint Vincent and the Grenadines' most prominent basketball figures.

Professional career
On May 9, 2016, King set the record for most rebounds in a game for the VTB United League, with 25 rebounds in an 81–73 win over Tsmoki-Minsk.

On November 10, 2016, King signed with Stal Ostrów Wielkopolski of the Polish Basketball League. King was named the PLK Most Valuable Player of the 2016–17 season.

On September 6, 2017, King signed with Slovenian club Sixt Primorska for the 2017–18 season.

For the 2019–20 season, King signed with Denain in France, a team which played in the LNB Pro B, and averaged 7 points and 7 rebounds per game. On August 12, 2020, he rejoined Stal Ostrów Wielkopolski.

International career
King represents the Saint Vincent and the Grenadines national basketball team internationally. He grabbed most rebounds and blocked most shots for his national team at the 2015 FIBA CBC Championship in Road Town, British Virgin Islands.

References

External links
FIBA Profile
Latinbasket.com Profile

1982 births
Living people
BC Kalev/Cramo players
BC Odesa players
BC Tsmoki-Minsk players
BCM Gravelines players
Centers (basketball)
Denain Voltaire Basket players
Expatriate basketball people in Estonia
Junior college men's basketball players in the United States
Korvpalli Meistriliiga players
Oral Roberts Golden Eagles men's basketball players
People from Gasparillo
Saint Vincent and the Grenadines men's basketball players
Saint Vincent and the Grenadines people of Trinidad and Tobago descent
SLUC Nancy Basket players
Stal Ostrów Wielkopolski players
STB Le Havre players
Virtus Bologna players
Saint Vincent and the Grenadines expatriate sportspeople in Ukraine